Elżbieta Róża Jankowska (born 1 August 1952) is a Polish political figure who served in the national Parliament (Sejm) from September 2001 to November 2007.

A native of Łódź, Poland's second-largest city (since 1998, third-largest), Elżbieta Jankowska was elected as a member of the Democratic Left Alliance in the election of 2001, serving in the Sejm until the election of 2005, when she was re-elected from Łódź district 9 with 7495 votes.  She lost her seat in the election of November 2007.

See also
Members of Polish Sejm 2005–2007

External links
Elżbieta Jankowska at the Sejm website (includes declarations of interest, voting record and transcripts of speeches)

1952 births
Councillors in Łódź
Democratic Left Alliance politicians
Living people
Members of the Polish Sejm 2001–2005
Members of the Polish Sejm 2005–2007
Women members of the Sejm of the Republic of Poland
Politicians from Łódź
21st-century Polish women politicians